Olivier Bochu (born 1 August 1971) is a French former professional footballer who played as a defender.

Personal life 
On 8 January 2022, Bochu was present at his former club Grenoble's Stade des Alpes for the occasion of a Club des Anciens gathering during a match against Auxerre.

Honours 
Caen

 Division 2: 1995–96

Nîmes

 Coupe de France runner-up: 1995–96

Beauvais

 Championnat National: 1999–2000

Notes

References

External links 

 
 

1971 births
Living people
Sportspeople from Grenoble
French footballers
Association football defenders
Grenoble Foot 38 players
Stade Malherbe Caen players
Nîmes Olympique players
FC Martigues players
AS Beauvais Oise players
FC Gueugnon players
FC Istres players
Thonon Evian Grand Genève F.C. players
Ligue 2 players
French Division 3 (1971–1993) players
Championnat National 2 players
Ligue 1 players
Championnat National players
Footballers from Auvergne-Rhône-Alpes